Ullàlla is a music album by Italian singer-songwriter Antonello Venditti. It was released in 1976.

Track listing
"Maria Maddalena" - 4:54
"Nostra Signora di Lourdes (Compromessi sposi)" - 2:45
"Canzone per Seveso" - 5:23
"Una stupida e lurida storia d'amore" - 3:42
"Jodi e la scimmietta" - 6:31
"Strada" - 4:32

Antonello Venditti albums
1976 albums